Abdulellah Saad Hamid Al-Wahbi Al-Malki (born 11 October 1994) is a Saudi professional footballer who currently plays as a midfielder for Al-Hilal.

Career

Club 
Al-Malki previously played for Al-Wehda from 2015 until 2019. He helped Al-Wehda earn promotion to the Pro League twice. First in 2014–15 as runners-up and second in 2017–18 after winning the MS League. He joined Al-Ittihad during the summer transfer window of 2019. He spent three years at the club and made 81 appearances in all competitions. On 22 January 2022, Al-Malki joined rivals Al-Hilal on a four-year contract.

International 
He was first called up to the Saudi Arabia national team in 2019 and he went on to play a role on helping Saudi Arabia to qualify for the 2022 FIFA World Cup. He gained prominence in the World Cup, however, by a fatal mistake in the next game against Poland, as he mishandled the ball and let Robert Lewandowski intercept it, eventually leading to the Polish legend to score his first-ever World Cup goal as Saudi Arabia lost 2–0. Saudi Arabia went on to be eliminated from the group stage, despite achieving a historic 2–1 shock win over Argentina in the opener.

Career statistics

Club
As of 22 January 2022.

International
Source:

Honours
Al-Wehda Club
MS League: 2017–18
Al-Hilal
Saudi Professional League: 2021–22

References

External links 
 

1994 births
Living people
People from Taif
Saudi Arabian footballers
Al-Wehda Club (Mecca) players
Ittihad FC players
Al Hilal SFC players
Saudi First Division League players
Saudi Professional League players
Association football midfielders
Saudi Arabia youth international footballers
Saudi Arabia international footballers
2022 FIFA World Cup players